H. Isabel Graham (May 13, 1869 — October 29, 1941) was a Canadian poet.

Early life
Hannah Isabel Graham was born at Harpurhey, near Seaforth, Ontario. the daughter of the Rev. William G. Graham, a Presbyterian minister, and Elizabeth Gouinlock. Her parents were both from Scotland. Graham wrote a pamphlet, "Fifty Years of Presbyterianism in Egmondville" (1896), about her father's work. H. Isabel Graham studied piano, pipe organ, and harmony at the Toronto College of Music.

Career
Graham's poetry was published in Canadian and American newspapers and magazines, and collected in the volumes A Song of December and Other Poems (1904), Saint Ignace and Other Poems (1934), and Be of Good Cheer (1939). She sometimes used Scottish English vocabulary, spelling, and other features of the dialect. Themes were religious or patriotic, with titles including "There's Aye a Something", "Does Memory Live?" "No Country's Like Our Own Dear Land", "The Prodigal Child", "The Crown", "To Those Who Wait" "To An Invalided Soldier", "The Christmas Ship", and "Open the Door".

Personal life
Hannah Isabel Graham died in 1941, aged 72 years. Her gravesite (under the name "Hannah Isabella Graham") is with those of her parents, at Egmondville, Ontario.

References

External links
 

1869 births
1941 deaths
Canadian women poets
Canadian women in World War I
19th-century Canadian poets
20th-century Canadian poets
19th-century Canadian women writers
20th-century Canadian women writers